There are 6 districts in Sikkim, an Indian state, each overseen by a Central Government appointee, the district collector, who is in charge of the administration of the civilian areas of the districts. The Indian army has control of a large territory, as the state is a sensitive border area. Many areas are restricted and permits are needed to visit them. There are a total of eight towns and nine subdivisions in Sikkim.

On December 21, 2021, the Government of Sikkim announced the formation of 2 new districts as well as the renaming of the existing 4 districts. North Sikkim district will now be called Mangan; West Sikkim district will be Gyalshing, East Sikkim district will now be Gangtok district and South Sikkim will be Namchi district.
The six districts are:

References

 
Districts
Sikkim